Port Road (and its northern section as Commercial Road through Port Adelaide) is a major road in Adelaide, South Australia connecting the Adelaide city centre with Port Adelaide.

Route

Port Road starts at the north-western corner of the Adelaide city centre, at the intersection of North Terrace and West Terrace, and heads northwest, turning north at Thebarton to become part of the City Ring Route, before meeting Park Terrace at Hindmarsh and heading northwest again with its widened median, crossing the North-South Motorway and heading through the suburbs of Woodville and Cheltenham, before it turns northwards at Alberton to cross Grand Junction Road, changing name to Commercial Road and terminating not long afterwards in the centre of Port Adelaide.

History
The road includes a very wide median strip, giving a total width of approximately 70 metres. The original design was conceived soon after the establishment of Adelaide, was to accommodate a standard road and a canal, with the canal later replaced in the plans by a railway line. The canal and railway line were never created in the road allotment: the railway line when built in 1853 was built approximately 1 km to the east. Since the extension of the Glenelg tram line in 2009–10, 200 metres of median strip at the city end is occupied by tram lines.

In the 1968 Metropolitan Adelaide Transport Study (MATS plan) the road was destined to be upgraded to become the Port Freeway. The plan fell through, yet in 2005 the Government of South Australia announced a 600 m tunnel for South Road below Port Road and the railway line. The Torrens Road to River Torrens project to upgrade South Road to include a free-flowing road in a trench under Port Road and several other intersections started construction in 2015 and was completed by the end of 2018.

Some routes in Adelaide were renumbered in 2017. Port Road had been designated route A21 (city ring route) between West Terrace and Park Terrace. After the change, the West Terrace end is not numbered, and it bears route R1 (city ring route) between James Congdon Drive and Park Terrace.

Major intersections

See also

References

External links
South Australian History: Port Adelaide

Roads in Adelaide